Robert Gothie (October 2, 1929 – June 18, 1993) was an American actor who appeared on television, in the movies and on Broadway in the 1950s and 1960s. Originally from Hazelton, Pennsylvania, Gothie played guest roles in TV series such as Sugarfoot, Sea Hunt, My Three Sons and The Virginian. He got a chance at a regular role as Private Sam Hanson in the short-lived World War II series The Gallant Men.

Gothie also appeared in the movies Sanctuary (1961) and Palm Springs Weekend (1963). On Broadway he was a stage manager and performer in Everybody Loves Opal (1961), and he acted in A Visit to a Small Planet (1957).

Filmography 

 Sea Hunt (1960) - Season 3, Episode 15

References

External links

TV.com page for Robert Gothie

1929 births
1993 deaths
20th-century American male actors